Miss Spain 2016 may refer to these events:
Miss Universe Spain 2016, Miss Spain 2016 for Miss Universe 2016
Miss World Spain 2016, Miss Spain 2016 for Miss World 2016